Diego Gabriel Gouveia Garcia (born 30 July 1997 in Maia) is a Portuguese professional footballer who plays for U.S.D. 1913 Seregno Calcio as a forward.

Club career
On 6 November 2016, Garcia made his professional debut with Akragas in a 2016–17 Lega Pro match against Melfi.

References

External links

1997 births
Living people
Portuguese footballers
Association football forwards
Serie C players
S.S. Akragas Città dei Templi players
U.S. 1913 Seregno Calcio players
People from Maia, Portugal
Sportspeople from Porto District